Phibun Mangsahan is a district (amphoe) in the central part of Ubon Ratchathani province, northeastern Thailand.

Geography
Neighboring districts are (from the south clockwise) Buntharik, Det Udom, Na Yia, Sawang Wirawong, Tan Sum, Si Mueang Mai, Khong Chiam and Sirindhorn of Ubon Ratchathani Province.

History
Originally named Phimun Mangsahan (พิมูลมังสาหาร), it was renamed to Phibun Mangsahan on 30 July 1940.

Administration

Central administration 
Phibun Mangsahan is divided into 14 sub-districts (tambons), which are further subdivided into 180 administrative villages (mubans).

Missing numbers belong to tambon which now form Sirindhorn District.

Local administration 
There is one town (thesaban mueang) in the district:
 Phibun Mangsahan consisting of sub-district Phibun.

There are four sub-district municipalities (thesaban tambon) in the district:
 Ang Sila consisting of parts of sub-district Ang Sila.
 Kut Chomphu consisting of sub-district Kut Chomphu.
 Pho Sai consisting of sub-district Pho Sai.
 Pho Si consisting of sub-district Pho Si.

There are 10 sub-district administrative organizations (SAO) in the district:
 Don Chik consisting of sub-district Don Chik.
 Sai Mun consisting of sub-district Sai Mun.
 Na Pho consisting of sub-district Na Pho.
 Non Klang consisting of sub-district Non Klang.
 Rawe consisting of sub-district Rawe.
 Rai Tai consisting of sub-district Rai Tai.
 Nong Bua Hi consisting of sub-district Nong Bua Hi.
 Ang Sila consisting of parts of sub-district Ang Sila.
 Non Kalong consisting of sub-district Non Kalong.
 Ban Khaem consisting of sub-district Ban Khaem.

References

External links
amphoe.com

Phibun Mangsahan